James Ray Knepp II (born 1964) is a United States district judge of the United States District Court for the Northern District of Ohio and a former United States magistrate judge of the same court.

Education 

Knepp earned his Bachelor of Arts, magna cum laude, from Mount Union College, his Master of Arts from Bowling Green State University, and his Juris Doctor, summa cum laude, from the University of Toledo College of Law, where he was a member of the editorial board for the University of Toledo Law Review.

Career 

Upon graduating from law school, Knepp served as a law clerk to Judge John William Potter of the United States District Court for the Northern District of Ohio. He then worked as a litigation attorney for fifteen years with the law firm Robison, Curphey & O’Connell in Toledo, Ohio.

Federal judicial service 

Knepp served as a United States magistrate judge of the United States District Court for the Northern District of Ohio, a position he was appointed to on July 30, 2010, and left in 2020 upon becoming a district judge.

On February 26, 2020, President Donald Trump announced his intent to nominate Knepp to serve as a United States district judge of the United States District Court for the Northern District of Ohio. On March 3, 2020, his nomination was sent to the Senate. President Trump nominated Knepp to the seat vacated by Judge Jack Zouhary, who assumed senior status on July 1, 2019. A hearing on his nomination before the Senate Judiciary Committee was held on July 29, 2020. On September 17, 2020, his nomination was reported out of committee by a 17–5 vote. On November 9, 2020, the United States Senate invoked cloture on his nomination by a 62–23 vote. On November 10, 2020, his nomination was confirmed by a 64–24 vote. He received his judicial commission on November 13, 2020.

References

External links 
 

1964 births
Living people
20th-century American lawyers
21st-century American lawyers
21st-century American judges
Bowling Green State University alumni
Judges of the United States District Court for the Northern District of Ohio
Lawyers from Toledo, Ohio
Ohio lawyers
Ohio Republicans
People from Akron, Ohio
United States magistrate judges
United States district court judges appointed by Donald Trump
University of Mount Union alumni
University of Toledo College of Law alumni